Burhanuddin Abdullah (born 10 July 1947) is a former Governor of Bank Indonesia, in office from 2003 to 2008. He succeeded Syahril Sabirin who had been Governor from 1999 to 2003. He has been convicted of corruption.

Education
Burhanuddin had been a student at Padjadjaran University in Bandung where he graduated with a degree in agriculture in 1974. He later studied at Michigan State University in the United States graduating with a Master of Arts (MA) in economics in 1984.

Early career
Burhanuddin joined Bank Indonesia in the late 1970s and held a number of positions in the organization.

 1979 Staff member, Management of General Credit.
1984 Staff member, General Economics Section, Management of Research and Statistics.
 1986 Staff, Governor of Bank Indonesia.
 1991 Alternative Executive Director, IMF, for the Southeast Asia Group (Indonesia, Brunei Darussalam, Fiji, Lao PDR, Malaysia, Myanmar, Nepal, Singapore, Thailand, Tonga, and Viet Nam), Washington, D.C.
 1994 Head, International Trade and Economic Cooperation Section, External Affairs, Bank Indonesia.
 1995 Deputy Head, External Affairs, Bank Indonesia.
 1996 Deputy Head, Monetary and Economic Research, Bank Indonesia.
 1998 Director, External Affairs Directorate, Bank Indonesia.
 2000 Deputy Governor, Bank Indonesia.

Ministerial appointment
Before being appointed Governor of Bank Indonesia, Burhanuddin had held senior economic positions in government in Indonesia.  He had briefly been Coordinating Minister of Economics, Finance and Industry in the National Unity Cabinet led by President Abdurrahman Wahid between 12 June 2001 and 9 August 2001.  He later became the Chair of the Indonesian Economic Scholars Association (Ikatan Sarjana Ekonomi Indonesia).

Burhanuddin's appointment as Governor of Bank Indonesia was approved by the Indonesian parliament after he had been nominated as a candidate for the position by President Megawati Sukarnoputri in early 2003. President Megawati nominated three people for the parliament to consider, the other two candidates being Miranda Goeltom and Cyrillus Harinowo, both senior managers in Bank Indonesia.

Later developments
In April 2008, Burhanuddin was arrested for alleged involvement in the misuse of Bank Indonesia funds and subsequently sentenced to five years in jail for his role in the management of the funds.  He was released from jail in March 2010 after serving two years of his sentence.  After his release, Burhanuddin was active in community affairs, giving lectures on policy and management issues to professional organisations and in universities in Indonesia.

References

1974 births
Living people
20th-century Indonesian economists
Governors of Bank Indonesia
Gadjah Mada University alumni
People from Garut
Great Indonesia Movement Party politicians
Indonesian politicians convicted of corruption
Sundanese people
21st-century Indonesian economists